The 1985 Women's World Outdoor Bowls Championship  was held at the Reservoir Bowling Club  in Preston, Victoria, Melbourne, Australia from 13 February to 4 March 1985.

Merle Richardson of Australia won the Sylko Trophy (Singles Gold medal), Australia also won the Sussex Trophy (Pairs) and Worthing Trophy (Triples). Scotland secured the Henselite Trophy (Fours) and Australia won the Taylor Trophy, sponsored by the Daily Mirror for the being the best overall team.

Medallists

Results

Women's singles – round robin

Women's pairs – round robin

Women's triples – round robin

Women's fours – round robin

Taylor Trophy

References

World Outdoor Bowls Championship
Bowls in Australia
Sports competitions in Melbourne
1985 in Australian sport
1985 in bowls
February 1985 sports events in Australia
March 1985 sports events in Australia